Cyrtodactylus condorensis is a species of gecko, a lizard in the family Gekkonidae. The species is endemic to Côn Sơn Island in Vietnam.

Etymology
The specific name, condorensis, refers to the island's former English name, Pulo Condore.

Description
Dorsally, it is grayish-brown, with large dark spots on the body, and dark crossbars on the tail. Ventrally it is light brownish. On the head, there is a dark streak through each eye, the streaks joining on the nape. The male has enlarged femoral scales and 4-7 preanal pores.

Reproduction
C. condorensis is oviparous.

References

Further reading
Smith MA (1921). "Reptiles and Batrachians Collected on Pulo Condore". Journal of the Natural History Society of Siam 4 (2): 93-97 + Plate. (Gymnodactylus condorensis, new species, p. 94 + Plate, figures 1 & 2).
Underwood G (1954). "On the classification and evolution of geckos". Proceedings of the Zoological Society of London 124 (3): 469–492. (Cyrtodactylus condorensis, new combination, p. 475).

Cyrtodactylus
Reptiles described in 1921